The 2023 Formula Pro USA FR Winter Series was the third season of the Formula Regional-level winter series held as counterpart to the Formula Pro USA Western FR Championship. As is the main series, the winter championship is promoted and organized by Exclusive Racing and Exclusive Auctions. The championship was run under the same sporting regulations as the FIA-sanctioned Formula Regional Americas Championship.

Teams and drivers 
All drivers competed with Honda-powered Ligier JS-F3 cars on Avon tires.

Race calendar 
The 2023 winter series calendar consisted of two rounds with two races each. Compared to 2022, Auto Club Speedway did not return to the schedule, with Thunderhill Raceway Park replacing it.

Race results

Season report 
Only two drivers competed in the winter series, a significant reduction from previous seasons. David Burketh was the man to beat at Sonoma Raceway in round one, as he won both races. Nicole Havrda retired from race two, giving Burketh a 32-point advantage heading into the final round. But Burketh did not start the final two races, allowing Havrda to take both race wins as the only driver in her class. This meant she turned over her points deficit, finishing 18 points ahead of Burketh and claiming the championship title.

Championship standings 
Points were awarded as follows:

See also 

 2023 Formula Pro USA Western FR Championship

References

External links 

 Official website: 

Formula Pro USA Winter Series
Formula Pro USA